Oldřich Černík (October 27, 1921 – October 19, 1994) was a Czechoslovak Communist political figure. He was the prime minister of Czechoslovakia from April 8, 1968, to January 28, 1970.

A party official and well-known technocrat, Černík was a strong supporter of the Prague Spring reforms of 1968. In August 1968 he was forced to go to the Soviet Union along with other politicians, and when he returned he asked the Czech people to cooperate with the Soviet Union but promised to continue reforms. After party leader Alexander Dubček was replaced with Gustáv Husák in 1969, Černík publicly distanced himself from his previous support of reform. It was not enough to prevent him from being forced out as prime minister in 1970; he was expelled from the party soon afterward. He attempted a political comeback in the early 1990s after the end of the communist regime. In 1994, he survived a serious car accident; shortly afterward he died in Prague of cardiac arrest. His grave portrait at the Vyšehrad Cemetery was created by Jitka Malovaná.

References 

1921 births
1994 deaths
Politicians from Ostrava
Members of the Central Committee of the Communist Party of Czechoslovakia
Prime Ministers of Czechoslovakia
Members of the National Assembly of Czechoslovakia (1960–1964)
Members of the National Assembly of Czechoslovakia (1964–1968)
Members of the Chamber of the People of Czechoslovakia (1969–1971)
Czech communists
Prague Spring
People of the Velvet Revolution
Communist Party of Czechoslovakia prime ministers
Burials at Vyšehrad Cemetery
Technical University of Ostrava alumni